The New York Emmy Awards are a division of the National Academy of Television Arts and Sciences honoring those in television and advanced media in the tri-state New York-New Jersey-Connecticut and New York State. The division was founded in 1955 and in addition to granting the New York Emmy Awards, the chapter also recognizes awards scholarships, honors industry veterans at the Silver Circle Celebration, has a free research and a nationwide job bank. The chapter also participates in judging Emmy entries at the regional and national levels.

References

Regional Emmy Awards
Awards established in 1955
1955 establishments in New York City